Andrew Wheeler may refer to:

Andrew R. Wheeler (born 1964), administrator of the U.S. Environmental Protection Agency 
Andrew Carpenter Wheeler (1835–1903), American drama critic
Andrew Wheeler (basketball) (born 1988), New Zealand basketball player
Andrew Wheeler-Omiunu (born 1994), American soccer player

See also
Andrew Wheeler Doig (1799–1875), American politician